Chollangi is a village in Thallarevu Mandal in  East Godavari District, Andhra Pradesh, India.

References

Villages in East Godavari district